Cyril "Bill" McMaster (born 30 January 1930) is a former Australian rules footballer and a coach in the Victorian Football League (VFL).

External links

1930 births
Living people
Geelong Football Club players
Geelong Football Club Premiership players
Geelong Football Club coaches
Australian rules footballers from Victoria (Australia)
Two-time VFL/AFL Premiership players